Werner Roth may refer to:

 Werner Roth (footballer) (1925–2011), German football player and coach
 Werner Roth (soccer) (born 1948), American soccer player
 Werner Roth (comics) (1921–1973), American comic book artist